Ronaldo Aparecido Viana, known as Ronaldo Viana (born 7 January 1979) is a Brazilian football midfielder.

Club career
Born in Vera Cruz do Oeste, he played with W Connection between 2002 and 2008.  During the winter of the 2003–04 season, he was loaned to Serbian club FK Železnik along Gefferson Goulart. Both stayed till next winter, playing the second half of the 2003–04 and first half of the 2004–05 First League of Serbia and Montenegro seasons. He made two appearances in the 2004–05 season.

He spent some time back in Brazil after leaving W Connection in 2007 and he played with Trindade Atlético Clube during first semester of 2009.  He then returned to Trinidad and Tobago and signed a 10-month deal with San Juan Jabloteh in April 2010. By September 2010 he moved to Antigua and Barbuda and signed a 6-months deal with Parham.  He played again with San Juan Jabloteh during the season 2012–13.

Honors
W Connection
TT Pro League: 2005
Trinidad and Tobago Cup: 2002

Železnik
Serbia and Montenegro Cup: 2004–05

San Juan Jabloteh
Trinidad and Tobago Cup: 2010–11

Parham
Antigua and Barbuda Premier Division: 2010–11
Antigua and Barbuda FA Cup: 2011–12

References

1979 births
Living people
Brazilian footballers
Brazilian expatriate footballers
Association football midfielders
W Connection F.C. players
San Juan Jabloteh F.C. players
TT Pro League players
Expatriate footballers in Trinidad and Tobago
FK Železnik players
First League of Serbia and Montenegro players
Expatriate footballers in Serbia and Montenegro
Expatriate footballers in Antigua and Barbuda